Laocypris hispida is a species of cyprinid fish endemic to Laos.  It is the only species in its genus.

References

 

Cyprinid fish of Asia
Endemic fauna of Laos
Fish described in 2000